Air & Cosmos is a French-language weekly industry magazine that covers the aerospace sector. The first issue was published on 25 March 1963. As of 2013, the magazine is the leading industry magazine in the French language; and one of the top three industry magazines, the other two being English-language publications Aviation Week & Space Technology and Flight International. The magazine is owned by Discom, who bought it in 2013.

History
In 1963, many contributors from Les Ailes (English: "Wings"; published: 1921-1963) were also published in Air & Cosmos. The founding publisher Eugène Bollard stated that the magazine would cover aviation fans, aviation advocacy, commercial aviation, aeronautic sector, astronautic sector, military aviation, general aviation, and youth interest. The founding editor, Jean-Marie Riche, had been assistant editor at Les Ailes. The first assistant editor, Roland Desbarbieux, had been assistant editor at L'Air et l'Espace (English: "Air and Space").
.

At the end of the 1980s, Revenu Multimedia of Robert Monteux, bought the magazine.

In 2013, Revenu Multimedia sold the magazine to Discom of Hubert de Caslou.

Air & Cosmos International
Air & Cosmos International is an English language website published by Air & Cosmos and derived from the French-language magazine's content.

See also
 Jane's Defence Weekly, a similar magazine for the defense sector

References

External links
  Official website: http://www.air-cosmos.com/
 English web edition: http://www.aircosmosinternational.com/

1963 establishments in France
Aviation magazines
Business magazines published in France
French-language magazines
Magazines established in 1963
Magazines published in Paris
Military magazines published in France
Weekly magazines published in France